The 2nd constituency of Komárom-Esztergom County is one of the single member constituencies of the National Assembly, the national legislature of Hungary. The constituency standard abbreviation: Komárom-Esztergom 02. OEVK.

Since 2022, it has been represented by Gábor Erős of the Fidesz–KDNP party alliance.

Geography
The 2nd constituency is located in eastern part of Komárom-Esztergom County.

List of municipalities
The constituency includes the following municipalities:

Members
The constituency was first represented by Pál Völner of the Fidesz from 2014 to 2022. He was succeeded by Gábor Erős of the Fidesz in 2022.

References

Komárom-Esztergom 2nd